Basilio is a name of Italian, Spanish, or Portuguese origin. It is a cognate of the English name Basil. The name may refer to:

Given name
Basilio Augustín (1840–1910), Spanish Governor-General of the Philippines briefly in 1898
Basilio Badillo (1885–1935), Mexican educator and politician; served briefly as Governor of Jalisco 1921–22
Basilio Basili (1804–1895), Italian tenor and composer
Basílio da Gama (1740–1795), Brazilian poet and Jesuit priest, writing under the pen name Termindo Sipílio
Basilio de Bragança Pereira (born 1945), Brazilian statistician
Basilio do Nascimento (born 1950), Roman Catholic bishop of Baucau, East Timor
Basilio Farinha (born 1977), Portuguese politician
Basilio Lami Dozo (1929–2017), Argentine military officer; member of the military junta ruling Argentina 1981–82
Basilio Martín Patino (born 1930), Spanish documentary film director
Basilio Owono (born 1999), Equatorial Guinean footballer
Basilio Paraíso (1849–1930), Aragonese businessman and politician
Basilio Pompili (1858–1931), Italian cardinal of the Roman Catholic Church
Basilio Santa Cruz Pumacallao (a.k.a. Pumaqallo or Pumacalla, 1635–1710), Peruvian Quechua painter
Basilio Villarino (1741–1785), Spanish naval officer; sailed around Cape Horn
Basilio J. Valdes (1892-1970), Filipino Doctor, General and Minister during World War II
Basílio (footballer) (born 1972), Brazilian footballer

Surname 
Carmen Basilio (1927–2012), Italian-American professional boxer
Charles Fernando Basílio da Silva (1985–2019), Brazilian professional football player, playing for Russia
Enriqueta Basilio (a.k.a. Queta Basilio), (born 1948), Mexican Olympic hurdler
Paloma San Basilio (born 1950), Spanish singer

Characters 
 Cousin Basilio, a character and 1878 novel by José Maria de Eça de Queiroz
 Don Basilio, a character in the 1816 opera The Barber of Seville by Rossini
 a character in the 1786 opera The Marriage of Figaro by Mozart
 a character in the novels Noli Me Tángere (novel) (1887) and El filibusterismo (1891) by Jose Rizal
 a character in the 1636 Spanish play Life Is a Dream by Pedro Calderón de la Barca
 Basilio the Cat, a crook cat from the 1936 The Golden Key, or the Adventures of Buratino fairy tale
 a playable character from the video game Fire Emblem Awakening

Places 
Dom Basílio, town in Brazil
San Basilio (disambiguation)